Laurence Gordon "Corky" Laing (born January 26, 1948) is a Canadian rock drummer, best known as a longtime member of pioneering American hard rock band Mountain.

20th century
A native of Montreal, Quebec, Laing was the youngest in a family of five children. His eldest sister Carol was followed by triplet brothers, Jeffrey, Leslie, and Stephen, and then by Corky. According to Corky, his brothers called him "Gorky" because they could not pronounce his given name "Gordon". "Gorky" eventually morphed into Corky, a moniker which has remained with him throughout his career.

Getting his break playing drums for vocal group The Ink Spots in 1961, he later played in a group called Energy, who was produced by Cream collaborator and Laing's future bandmate Felix Pappalardi. Laing left Energy in 1969 to replace drummer N.D. Smart in a hard rock outfit and heavy metal forerunner Mountain, who, with Laing at the drum kit, released three albums and the classic song "Mississippi Queen" between 1970 and 1971.

 
After the band's first breakup the following year, Laing and Mountain bandmate Leslie West went on to form blues-rock power trio West, Bruce and Laing with former Cream bassist/vocalist Jack Bruce. West, Bruce and Laing produced two studio albums and a live release before Mountain reformed without Laing in 1973 for a Japanese tour releasing the live Twin Peaks. Laing rejoined in 1974 recording Avalanche only for Mountain to break up again shortly after. The band would once again reconvene with guitarist Leslie West and Laing in 1985 for the release of Go For Your Life, and Laing has continued with them, most recently working on the band's 2007 Bob Dylan cover album Masters of War.

In late 1977, he recorded an album with Felix Pappalardi (former Mountain bass player), Ian Hunter (from Mott the Hoople) and Mick Ronson. This album was not released at the time but was subsequently released in the UK in 1999 as "The Secret Sessions".

In addition to Mountain, he has recorded as the group Cork, with Spin Doctors guitarist/vocalist Eric Schenkman and Noel Redding, formerly bass guitarist of The Jimi Hendrix Experience. In late 1975, he played congas on several tracks on Bo Diddley's all-star album The 20th Anniversary of Rock 'n' Roll.

In 1991, he was featured on Men Without Hats's cover version of The Beatles's song "I Am the Walrus" on drums.  This is available on the Sideways album.

21st century
In 2003, Laing and Leslie West authored Nantucket Sleighride and Other Mountain on-the-Road Stories, a chronicle of their time with Mountain in its heyday and their careers in the years following.

Laing lives in Toronto's historic Liberty Village and was interviewed for the 2006 documentary film, Liberty Village - Somewhere in Heaven. He contributed the music for the film from recordings of his band Cork.

In 2007, Laing recorded Stick It!, the audio version of his memoirs with Cory Bruyea in Oakville, Ontario. Laing's interest in education led him to attend the KoSA Music Camp in Vermont for the summer of 2012.

In 2019, he released his autobiography, Letters to Sarah.

Following the death of Leslie West in December 2020, Laing became the last surviving member of Mountain’s classic lineup. In 2016, he formed Corky Laing's Mountain, with former Mountain bassist Richie Scarlet, now on lead guitar, and the bass slot filled in by Mark Mikel, Joe Venti, or Bernt Ek.

Collaborators
Bo Diddley
Mahogany Rush
John Lennon
Bobby Keys
Ten Years After
David Rea
Mylon LeFevre
Meat Loaf
Mick Ronson

Discography

With Mountain

Studio albums
Climbing! (1970)
Nantucket Sleighride (1971)
Flowers of Evil (1971; partially live)
Avalanche (1974)
Go for Your Life (1985)
Man's World (1996)
Mystic Fire (2002)
Masters of War (2007)

Live albums
Mountain Live: The Road Goes Ever On (1972)
Eruption (2004)

Compilation albums
The Best of Mountain (1973)
Over the Top (2001)

West, Bruce and Laing
 1972 – Why Dontcha
 1973 – Whatever Turns You On
 1974 – Live 'n' Kickin'

With Leslie West 
 1975 – The Great Fatsby
 1976 – The Leslie West Band
 2005 – Guitarded

With Bartholomew plus III 
 1965 –  "She's Mine" / "You're Not There"
 1967 –  "When I Fall in Love"

With Cork 
 1999 – Speed of THought
 2003 – Out There

As Corky Laing 
 1977 – Making It On The Streets 
 2019 – Toledo Sessions

With Ian Hunter, Mick Ronson and Felix Pappalardi 
 1999 –  The Secret Sessions

With The Mix 
 1980 – American Glue

With The Perfect Child 
 2013 – Playing God

As Corky Laing's Mountain 
 2017 – Live in Melle
 2019 - Live At Howard's Club H

Guest appearances 
 1969 – David Rea – Maverick Child, drums
 1971 – David Rea – By the Grace of God, drums
 1972 – Bobby Keys – Bobby Keys, drums
 1976 – Bo Diddley – The 20th Anniversary of Rock N' Roll, congas
 1987 – Charlie Karp & the Name Droppers – Charlie Karp & the Name Droppers, percussion
 1991 – Men Without Hats – Sideways, on "I Am the Walrus", drums

Other
2004: Jason Hartless Jr. – First Division
2012: Corky Laing and The Memory Thieves – House of Thieves
2018: Pompeii – The Secret Sessions

References

External links

Official Mountain website

1948 births
Living people
Canadian rock drummers
Canadian male drummers
Mountain (band) members
Musicians from Montreal
Epic Records artists
Elektra Records artists
West, Bruce and Laing members
20th-century Canadian drummers
20th-century Canadian male musicians